Aloys Obrist, also Alois Obrist (30 March 1867 – 29 June 1910) was a German musicologist, Kapellmeister and conductor.

Life 
Born in Sanremo, Obrist studied music in Weimar and in Berlin where he received his doctorate in musicology in 1892. Afterwards he received a proposition to become Kapellmeister at the Augsburg City Theatre. From September 1895 to 1900 he was Hofkapellmeister at the Staatstheater Stuttgart (Kingdom of Württemberg), where he made great contributions to the modernization of the repertoire of subscription concerts of the Hofkapelle.

He was married to theatre actress . His brother Hermann Obrist was a famous sculptor.

Death 
Obrist's affair with the opera singer Anna Sutter was to prove fatal. After Sutter had ended the relationship in 1909 after two years, Obrist broke into her apartment on 29 June 1910, and - after his love was rejected once again - shot her with two pistol shots, before he took his own life with five shots.

Obrist died in Stuttgart at the age of 43.

Work 
 Melchior Franck. Ein Beitrag zur Geschichte der weltlichen Composition in Deutschland in der Zeit vor dem 30jährigen Krieg. Phil. Diss., Berlin 1892, online.
 Was sagt uns das Liszt-Museum? In Der Kunstwart. Munich: Callwey, vol. 19.1906, 21, .
 Klavierspielapparate und musikalische Seelenwerte. In Der Kunstwart. Munich, Callwey. vol. 19,1 (1905/06), 
 Die historische und künstlerische Bedeutung der Wiederbelebung altertümlicher Musikinstrumente. Vortrag, gehalten auf dem Basler Kongreß der "Internationalen Musikgesellschaft" i. J. 1906. In Zeitschrift für Instrumentenbau. Leipzig, de Wit. Vol. 27 (1907), 23 (11 May), 
 Richard Batka; Aloys Obrist: Klavierspielapparate. Munich: Callwey; Leipzig: Schlüter & Co.: 1914 (4th ed.). (Flugschrift zur Ausdruckskultur, Dürer-Bund; 8)

Literature 
 Georg Günther: Carmen – letzter Akt: die Künstlertragödie Sutter – Obrist von 1910 und die Stuttgarter Oper um 1900. Accompanying volume and catalogue to the exhibition of the State Archive Ludwigsburg and the City Archive Stuttgart (2001).
 Musikbibliothek des † Herrn Hofkapellmeisters Hofrat Dr. A. Obrist. Stuttgart: R. Levi, [1911]. (Antiquariats-Katalog Nr. 189 b R. Levi, Stuttgart)
 Melchior Franck, ein Beitrag zur Geschichte der weltlichen Composition in Deutschland in der Zeit vor dem 3ojährigen Krieg], Inaugural-Dissertation von Aloys Obrist<ref>[https://www.worldcat.org/oclc/458952400 Melchior Franck, ein Beitrag zur Geschichte der weltlichen Composition in Deutschland in der Zeit vor dem 3ojährigen Krieg] on WorldCat</ref>
 Neue Musikzeitung, 21st year, 1910, issue 20, .
 Musikalisches Wochenblatt,'' 1899,

References

External links 
 

19th-century German musicologists
20th-century German conductors (music)
1867 births
1910 suicides
People from Sanremo
German male conductors (music)
19th-century conductors (music)
19th-century German musicians
20th-century German musicologists
20th-century German male musicians
Murder–suicides in Germany
Suicides by firearm in Germany
Multiple gunshot suicides